Frotho III was a legendary king of Denmark. He was mentioned by Saxo Grammaticus in Gesta Danorum and in the Skjöldunga saga. Saxo's account of his reign is considered a historicized version of the Vana-god Frey and was particularly demonstrated in the section detailing the king's war against the Huns.

Background 
Frotho III was the son and successor of Fridlevus I. Frode reigned together with twelve "Diaren". He fought against the Slavs (sclavi) and defeated them. Then he stopped at the hand of the "Huns" subsidiary Hanunda. When they refused, he tried a sorceress to change her mind. Hanunda became his wife and bore a son Fridlevus. Then she went back to her father. Frode married Alvhild, a subsidiary of the Norwegian King Gothar. The King of the Huns attacked Frode with an alliance of several princes. After three days you could go over the corpses through the water. Frode won after seven days, called for the lords return to their dominions again. (Holmgard = Novgorod, Koenugard = Kiev, Revallis = Reval / Tallinn, Lapland, Eistland = Baltics). Frode was succeeded by his son Fridlevus.

Reign 
Saxo divided the life of Frotho III into two parts, each featuring counselors to the king. The first covered the king's ascendancy after the death of his father and was dominated by the issue of guardianship on account of his minority. This part was an unflattering account due to the influence of evil counselors. The second part, which roughly began in Book V, saw the emergence of the virtuous Ericus as a new counselor who guided the king towards the path of Fortitudo, Temperantia, and Constantia. The new period described Frotho III as a peacemaker and legislator (law-giver) with Saxo claiming he was responsible for the Danish hegemony.

See also
 Fróði

References

Literature 
 Saxo Grammaticus, Gesta Danorum, 4.12, 13
 Skjöldunga saga
 V. A. Motornyĭ, Dietrich Scholze, Konstantin Konstantinovich Trofimovich: Prašenja sorabistiki, Sorbisches Institut (Institut slavistyky) Bautzen 2003 Digitalisat, S. 66

Mythological kings of Denmark